Marcelo Ríos defeated Mariano Zabaleta in the final, 6–7(5–7), 7–5, 5–7, 7–6(7–5), 6–2 to win the singles tennis title at the 1999 Hamburg European Open.

Albert Costa was the defending champion, but was defeated in the second round by Zabaleta.

Seeds 
A champion seed is indicated in bold text while text in italics indicates the round in which that seed was eliminated.  The top eight seeds received a bye into the second round.

Draw

Finals

Top half

Section 1

Section 2

Bottom half

Section 3

Section 4

References 

Singles
1999 ATP German Open
ATP German Open